Yejong is the temple name of two Korean monarchs:

 Yejong of Goryeo (1079-1122, r. 1105–1122)
 Yejong of Joseon (r. 1468–1469)

See also 
 Ruizong (disambiguation) (Chinese romanization)

Temple name disambiguation pages